Queerty is an online magazine and newspaper covering gay-oriented lifestyle and news, founded in 2005 by David Hauslaib. As of June 2015, the site had more than five million monthly unique visitors.

History
Queerty was founded by David Hauslaib in 2005 with Bradford Shellhammer serving as founding editor. The site briefly shut down operations in 2011 before being sold to Q.Digital, Inc., which currently owns and operates it.

Newsweek called Queerty "a leading site for gay issues" in 2010.

Since 2012, the site bestows the Queerty Awards or "Queerties", in which their readers vote for the "best of LGBTQ Media and Culture" every March.

References

External links

 

LGBT-related magazines published in the United States
Online magazines published in the United States
LGBT-related websites
Magazines established in 2005